The Outlaw and the Lady is a 1917 film featuring Harry Carey and released by Universal Pictures.

Cast
 Harry Carey
 Louise Lovely
 Jack Richardson
 William Steele - (as William Gettinger)
 Vester Pegg
 Tote Du Crow - Butler

See also
 Harry Carey filmography

External links
 

1917 films
American silent short films
American black-and-white films
1917 Western (genre) films
1917 short films
Films directed by Fred Kelsey
Silent American Western (genre) films
1910s American films
1910s English-language films